Sancterila is a genus of butterflies in the family Lycaenidae. 

It contains three subgenera: Sancterila, Celarchus, and Armentulus. Celarchus was originally described as a distinct genus, of which Armentulus was a subgenus. 

The nominotypical subgenus Sancterila contains four species endemic to Sulawesi and one species endemic to Buru and Ambon.

Species
Subgenus Sancterila Eliot & Kawazoé, 1983
Sancterila deliciosa (Pagenstecher, 1896)
Sancterila prattorum Eliot & Kawazoé, 1983
Sancterila drakei Cassidy, 1995
Sancterila russelli Eliot & Kawazoé, 1983
Subgenus Celarchus Eliot & Kawazoé, 1983
Sancterila archagathos (Fruhstorfer, 1910)
Sancterila hermarchus (Fruhstorfer, 1910)
Subgenus Armentulus Eliot & Kawazoé, 1983
Sancterila shelfordii (de Nicéville, 1902)

References

External links

"Sancterila Eliot & Kawazoé, 1983" at Markku Savela's Lepidoptera and Some Other Life Forms

Polyommatini